Swale railway station is in north Kent, England, on the Sheerness Line  from , at the southern end of the Kingsferry Bridge which, along with the more modern Sheppey Crossing, connects the Isle of Sheppey to mainland Kent. The nearest settlement is Iwade. Train services are provided by Southeastern.

Facilities

Swale is a single platform station with one curving platform. It is immediately adjacent to the A249 road which is on a flyover above the station before it crosses The Swale on the Sheppey Crossing. The station is named after The Swale, the channel which separates the Isle of Sheppey from the mainland and connects with the River Medway to the west and Thames Estuary to the west. North of the station, the railway line crosses the channel on the Kingsferry Bridge.

Swale Station is the least used station in Kent.

History 
The station was opened in 1913 as a staff halt, called Kings Ferry Bridge Halt.

This arrangement continued until 1 November 1923, when the bridge reopened to traffic and the North halt closed. The station was renamed Kings Ferry Bridge Halt on this date. The name was changed to Swale Halt in 1929. With the building of the new Kingsferry Bridge in 1960, a new station was constructed by British Railways on a different alignment, opening on 20 April 1960.

In 2005 the idea of closing Swale station, or at least replacing its train service with a token service (e.g. one train a week in either direction), was proposed by the Strategic Rail Authority (SRA) but rejected.

Services 
All services at Swale are operated by Southeastern using  EMUs.

The typical off-peak service in trains per hour is:
 1 tph to 
 1 tph to 

During the peak hours, the service is increased to 2 tph.

References

External links 

 Video about the station by Geoff Marshall from 2016

Railway stations in Swale
DfT Category F2 stations
Former London, Chatham and Dover Railway stations
Railway stations in Great Britain opened in 1913
Railway stations in Great Britain closed in 1960
Railway stations opened by British Rail
Railway stations in Great Britain opened in 1960
Railway stations served by Southeastern